Sibongile Mchunu is a South African politician. She is a member of the National Assembly of South Africa representing the African National Congress.

References

African National Congress politicians
Members of the National Assembly of South Africa
Living people
Year of birth missing (living people)
Place of birth missing (living people)